Jerome Monahan Burns (January 24, 1927 – May 12, 2021) was an American college and professional football coach. He played in college for the Michigan Wolverines before becoming a coach. He was the head coach for the Iowa Hawkeyes from 1961 to 1965, compiling a record of 16–27–2, and for the Minnesota Vikings of the National Football League (NFL) from 1986 to 1991, tallying a mark of 52–43 in the regular season, and 3–3 in the postseason. Between his head coaching stints Burns was a defensive assistant (1965–1967) for the Green Bay Packers, helping the team win Super Bowls I and II, and Offensive Coordinator (1968–1985) for the Minnesota Vikings, where he coached the team to four Super Bowl appearances.

Early coaching career
Burns served as the head baseball coach and assistant football coach with the University of Hawaii in 1951. Burns left Hawaii to coach at Whittier College in 1952, where he was the head basketball coach and an assistant football coach. At the beginning of 1953, he left Whittier and took a job as head football and head basketball coach at St. Mary's of Redford High School in Detroit, Michigan. Following the 1953 football season at St. Mary's, Burns was hired by fellow Michigan alumnus Forest Evashevski as an assistant coach at the University of Iowa. Burns began serving as an assistant coach at Iowa under Evashevski in 1954.

Iowa head coach
Burns served seven total years as an assistant coach to Evashevski. As part of a deal with Iowa Athletic Board, Evashevski was appointed Iowa's athletic director and agreed to appoint his successor. Burns was then appointed Burns to become Iowa's 20th head football coach beginning with the 1961 season.

Before his first game as a college head coach, the 1961 Hawkeye team was named the number one team in the AP Preseason Poll. Iowa started the season by winning their first four games in 1961 before losing their next four. In their final game, the Hawkeyes defeated Notre Dame 42–21 for the team's fifth win in six years over the Irish. Iowa finished the season 5–4, their last winning record until 1981.

In 1962, Iowa defeated both Michigan and Ohio State, the only time in school history that the school had defeated both teams in the same year. However, the Hawkeyes won only two other games and posted a 4–5 final record. The school's final game of the season against Notre Dame was canceled on account of the assassination of John F. Kennedy. The Hawkeyes finished 1963 with a 3–3–2 record.

A 3–0 start in the 1964 season quickly turned sour, as the Hawkeyes lost their final six games. Burns was now in real danger of being fired, but Iowa had several players returning in 1965 and the Hawkeyes were expected to be very good. Before the 1965 season, Playboy Magazine picked Iowa as their Preseason Number One team and predicted a 9–1 record. Instead, Iowa finished the year 1–9 and, before Iowa's final game that season, it was announced that Burns would not be retained in 1966. 

Of his firing, Burns said, "I want to be emphatic. I hold no ill feelings toward anyone. I hope, I sincerely hope, Iowa has great success in football in the future. If I can contribute to that future, I will." After his final game, his players hoisted him on their shoulders and carried him off the field, despite the loss. There were those who insisted that Athletic Director Evashevski wanted to return as football coach and that rather than helping Burns to succeed, Evashevski hampered him with rules and regulations that were not in force when he was the coach. But Burns ultimately said, "If we have failed, and we have, I'll take the responsibility for that. It is not the players' fault. They have done the best they can." He had a 16–27–2 record at Iowa.

Professional coaching career
Burns was 38 years of age when he was fired at Iowa. He moved on to the Green Bay Packers of the NFL and served for two years as an assistant coach to Vince Lombardi in 1966 and 1967 when the Packers won Super Bowl I and Super Bowl II. When Lombardi retired after the 1967 season, Burns was hired by Bud Grant of the Minnesota Vikings. Grant hired Burns to be his offensive coordinator. Burns served as Minnesota's offensive coordinator for the next 18 years, from 1968–1985. During that time, the Vikings made the playoffs 12 times, won 11 division titles, and played in four Super Bowls.
 
When Grant retired from coaching for the second time in 1985, Burns was named as the 4th head coach of the Minnesota Vikings on January 7, 1986. He coached Minnesota for six years, from 1986 to 1991. Burns compiled a record of 52–43 and led the Vikings to the playoffs three times. He helped the Vikings win the division title in 1989 and led them to the NFC championship game in 1987. On November 5, 1989, Burns gave a profanity laced tirade during a postgame press conference where he defended his offensive coordinator, Bob Schnelker, despite the fact that the Vikings' Rich Karlis kicked a then league record-tying seven field goals en route to a 23–21 overtime victory over the Los Angeles Rams.

On December 4, 1991, Burns announced that he would retire from coaching after the 1991 NFL season; he finished his final season with an 8–8 record. He has been nominated for the Pro Football Hall of Fame, but has yet to gain the votes necessary for induction. In 1998, Burns gave the Hall of Fame induction speech for Paul Krause, a defensive back he coached both at Iowa and with the Vikings.

Death
Burns died on May 12, 2021, at the age of 94 due to a variety of ongoing health issues at his home in Eden Prairie, Minnesota. The Minnesota Vikings, former Vikings Head Coach Bud Grant, former (then current) Vikings Head Coach Mike Zimmer, and Hall of Fame Quarterback Fran Tarkenton released statements paying tribute.

Head coaching record

College football

NFL

References

1927 births
2021 deaths
American football quarterbacks
Basketball coaches from Michigan
Green Bay Packers coaches
Hawaii Rainbow Warriors baseball coaches
Hawaii Rainbow Warriors football coaches
Iowa Hawkeyes football coaches
Michigan Wolverines football players
Minnesota Vikings head coaches
Whittier Poets football coaches
Whittier Poets men's basketball coaches
High school football coaches in Michigan
Players of American football from Detroit
Educators from Michigan
Coaches of American football from Michigan